Marja Merisalo (born 3 April 1965 Oulu, Finland) is a Finnish choreographer, dancer, director and cultural coordinator.
She has the Master of Arts degree of Dance from the Helsinki Theatre Academy (Teatterikorkeakoulu)
She represents contemporary art dance where she has developed her own styles. Marja Merisalo has worked as choreographer, dancer, actor, producer as well as director of theatre and dance projects. She has worked in numerous productions and theatres since 1982 including Q-teatteri in Helsinki, Helsinki City Theatre, the Student's Theatre of Helsinki (Ylioppilasteatteri) and the Finnish National Theatre.

Merisalo worked in the city of Pori as the Regional Artist under the Ministry of Education and Culture during the years 2009–2011. Her main work was coordinating numerous cultural activities in the municipality of Satakunta in western Finland. Later on she also made project-planning for an artist's network called ArtPeople in Helsinki during her work as cultural coordinator in the area of Arabia in Helsinki under Arts Promotion Centre Finland (Taiteen edistämiskeskus, formerly Arts Council of Finland).

Since 2006, Merisalo has been a member of Theatre of Eternal Values (TEV), an international theatre group based in Italy. She has been touring with the group's productions internationally in West End - London, Manhattan - New York City, Milan, Rome, Geneva, Basel, Istanbul and Ankara.
Moreover, besides Finland she has also performed internationally in Australia, India, Sweden, the Baltic countries and Russia.

She has also created numerous dance and theatre projects, one of the latest being the "Echoes from Karelia", which brings together a fusion of traditional Karelian folk culture with modern elements. The project has toured in Finland, Sweden, Russia and Italy.

Choreographies
Ilmatar in India, Sortavala, Russia 2019 (residence project in KARN, Karelian Art Residence Network)
Echoes from Karelia, Zelenogorsk and Sortavala, Russia 2015 and 2019, Sweden 2016, Italy 2018
Tid och Energi, Vantaa 2008, Pori 2011.
The Tyger, London 2007, Genova, Italy 2007. (also: Govisummer 2007 program)
Adimaya, Sydney, Australia 2006.
Elefanttimetsä ("Elephant Forest"), Dance Theatre Raatikko, Finland 2004.
O Lal Meri, Italy 2004.
Mahamaya, Mumbai, India 2003, Italy 2003.
Gypsies Are Found Near Heaven - "Mustalaisleiri muuttaa taivaaseen, Lappeenranta City Theatre, Finland 1997.Spring is coming - Kevät saapuu, Finlandia Hall 1995.

ProductionsTid och Energi, Martinus Concert Hall Vantaa, Finland 2008, Promenadisali Concert Hall, Pori Finland 2011.An article in Ulvilan Seutu -newspaper 13.4.201 Tuulen poika, Helsinki 2007, Arabia Primary School, Helsinki 2013Apinakuningas Hanuman, Keinutie Primary School, Helsinki 2006.Zum Zum Zananana, EU Urban II -project 2005.Tiikeri tanssii ("The Tiger is Dancing"), Dance Theatre Raatikko, Finland 2003.Pikkubussilla alkuräjähdyksestä atomiaikaan, Ateneum, Helsinki 1996 (a co-production with Finnish actress Emilia Pokkinen).Ilveilijän testamentti, Ylioppilasteatteri (Helsinki Student's theatre) 1992.
Theatre of Eternal Values: Eternity in an Hour, Helsinki Festival 2008, Tour in Italy Milan, Rome 2009, Swiss tour Geneva, Basel, 2009 New York Fringe Festival, New York City 2010, Theater Basel 2010, Touring Turkish National Theatres in Istanbul, Ankara and Bursa 2011.
Theatre of Eternal Values: William Blake's Divine Humanity, New Player's Theatre, West End, London, 2007.
Helsinki Theatre Academy: Paalu, 1994.
Ylioppilasteatteri: Ilveilijän testamentti, 1992.
Ylioppilasteatteri: Vanja-eno, 1992.
: Sudenhetki, Helsinki 1990.
Finnish National Theatre: Kullervo´s Story, 1989.
Ylioppilasteatteri: Zoo, 1989.
Helsinki City Theatre: Kalevala'', 1985.

Sources 
Helsinki City Theatre, list of performances (also:  and )
Milliyet-newpper blog 2011, Turkey
Zaman-newspaper, Turkey
Bursakultur, Türkiye
Bugünbugece Istanbul
biggistanbul kültür
Theater Basel 
The Happiest Medium theatre review, New York
New York Theatre Review
The FringeNYC festival
The FringeNYC festival program 2010  (also:  and)
TEV-theatre at New York Fringe festival
Eternity in an Hour
Biography in English (TEV Members)
- as cultural coordinator in Helsinki(also:)
Artova.fi (also:)
Tuulen Poika -performances in Arabia()
Art Coordinator´s blog
Kopiosto (CV)
Danceinfo
London Theatre Database
Indielondon (also: webcitation.org)
The Stage listings - UK (also:)
This is London, reviews
Helsinki Student´s theatre (Ylioppilasteatteri)
City of Pori News
Satakunnan taidetoimikunta, läänintaiteilijat - Regional artists of Satakunta, Finland 
Taiteen edistämiskeskus - Arts Council of Finland
Taiteen Edistämiskeskus - Arts Council of Finland - "Ilon ja Valon Satakunta" -festival
Ilon ja valon satakunta (also:  Ilon ja Valon viikolle vauhdikas alku - Uusi aika -newspaper 11.3.2010, also:  Iloa ja Valoa tänä vuonna lasten silmin - Satakunnan kansa -newspaper 2010)
Q-teatteri history
Dance Theatre Raatikko performances during 2000´s

References

1965 births
Living people
Finnish choreographers
Finnish directors
Finnish female dancers
Contemporary dancers
21st-century Finnish women artists
20th-century Finnish women artists